Bruno and the Banana Bunch is a Canadian animated children's television series created by Adam Shaheen. The series debuted on CBC Television in Canada on April 2, 2007.

Premise
Bruno and the Banana Bunch is about Bruno the monkey and his friends who have adventures in Bananaland.

Characters
 Bruno is a monkey and the main protagonist of the show. He embarks in creative adventures every episode with his friends.
 Green Crocodile is a green crocodile and Bruno's best friend. He appears in most episodes.
 Pink Cow is a pink cow and the second largest character.
 Big Elephant is an elephant and the largest character.
 Green Frog is a green frog.
 Blue Bunny is a blue rabbit.
 Fluffy Sheep is a white sheep.
 Purple Penguin is a purple penguin from the South Pole.
 Little Bird is a red bird. As her name suggests, she is the smallest character in stature.
 Yellow Duck is a yellow duck.
 Pink Flamingo is a pink flamingo. She is the only character with a long neck.

Episodes

References

External links

2000s Canadian animated television series
2007 Canadian television series debuts
2008 Canadian television series endings
Canadian children's animated adventure television series
Canadian children's animated fantasy television series
Canadian preschool education television series
Animated preschool education television series
2000s preschool education television series
CBC Television original programming
English-language television shows
Canadian computer-animated television series
Animated television series about monkeys